BBC Radio Merseyside is the BBC's local radio station serving Merseyside, North-West Cheshire and West Lancashire

It broadcasts on FM, DAB, digital TV and via BBC Sounds, from studios on Hanover Street in Liverpool.

According to RAJAR, the station has a weekly audience of 240,000 listeners and a 8.3% share as of December 2022.

History

BBC Radio Merseyside was the third BBC Local Radio station to start broadcasting, launching on 22 November 1967 and broadcasting from the sixth floor of council-owned offices in Commerce House, Liverpool. In late 1981 Radio Merseyside moved to a new purpose-built studios on Paradise Street, Liverpool. Broadcasts began from the new studios on 7 December 1981. On 15 July 2006, Radio Merseyside moved from its former home to a new purpose-built studio building on the corner of Hanover Street and College Lane in Liverpool. This building has two ground-floor studios next to a public performance space. An open learning centre is on the first floor and the main office is on the second floor.

In October 2006, the studio building was nominated and made the Building Design shortlist for the inaugural Carbuncle Cup, which was ultimately awarded to Drake Circus Shopping Centre in Plymouth.

Until the late 1980s the station was generally on air from breakfast until teatime, with any programming after 18:00 devoted to specialist music and magazines aimed at specialist interests and at ethnic minority communities. In early 1989, the four BBC stations in north west England launched an evening service called Network North West. It was broadcast each night from 19:30 until midnight. In May 1991, the four north-west stations joined the BBC Night Network, which had previously provided evening programming for the BBC's six north-east and Yorkshire stations. At this point, local broadcasts ended at 19:05 (19:00 at weekends) until midnight, extending to 00:30 in the early 1990s, and to 01:00 by the end of that decade.

Transmitters

BBC Radio Merseyside broadcasts on 95.8 MHz (Allerton Park) and DAB from the Allerton Park site and DAB signals come from the Bauer Digital Bauer Liverpool 10C Multiplex from Billinge Hill (between St Helens and Wigan), Hope Mountain (between Buckley and Wrexham) and the Radio City Tower (on top of Radio City's studios).

In 2018, BBC Radio Merseyside launched on the BBC Sounds app. Local sports commentaries are not broadcast on this service, due to licensing agreements.

In March 2020, BBC Radio Merseyside's 1485 AM signal was switched off and its licence was handed back to Ofcom. This was part of a new plan by BBC Local Radio to stop using AM frequencies across all of its stations.

In addition, BBC Radio Merseyside also broadcasts on Freeview TV channel 722 in the BBC North West region.

Programming
Local programming is produced and broadcast from the BBC's Liverpool studios from 6am - 1am on weekdays and from 6am - 10pm at weekends.

The late show, airing from 10pm - 1am, is simulcast with BBC Radio Lancashire on Friday nights and originates from BBC Radio Manchester on Saturday and Sunday nights.

During the station's downtime, BBC Radio Merseyside simulcasts overnight programming from BBC Radio 5 Live and BBC Radio London.

Notable past presenters

Norman Thomas
Pete Price
Simon O'Brien
Shelagh Fogarty (LBC)
Rob McCaffrey
Ray Stubbs 
Eddie Hemmings
Wayne Clarke
Janice Long (BBC Radio Wales / Greatest Hits Radio/ deceased)
Brian Jacques
Alan Parry (Sky Sports)
Rob Palmer
Gerry Harrison
Stephen Parry
Debi Jones
Billy Butler

Controversy
During a breakfast show on 25 June 2007, presenter Simon O'Brien accidentally broadcast an unedited interview in which he said, "fuck the government, fuck the planners". O'Brien resigned from the station later in the day. He later went on to present a short-lived Saturday breakfast show on the now defunct talk radio station Radio City Talk in Liverpool. Radio City Talk later used the phrase that led to his resignation as part of their launch marketing for the station.

References

External links
 BBC Radio Merseyside
 North West Radio
  History of local radio in Merseyside
 MDS975's Transmitter map.
 Allerton transmitter 95.8 MHz
 Hope Mountain (Digital)
 Wallasey transmitter 1485 KHz Mediumwave

Radio stations established in 1967
Radio stations in Merseyside
Merseyside
Mass media in Liverpool
Radio stations in Liverpool